Donald's Tire Trouble is a cartoon by Walt Disney Productions, featuring their character Donald Duck. It was directed by Dick Lundy and released in 1943. The cartoon pokes fun at the difficulties involved in America's rubber rationing, a consequence of World War II.

Plot
While speeding on the road, Donald Duck runs over a nail on a horseshoe ("Good luck! Bah!") causing it to pop his tire, necessitating its replacement with the car's spare. He encounters difficulty lifting the car with his jack, removing the damaged tire, inflating it and repairing it with a patch. Unfortunately for him, all four tires immediately pop once he resumes driving (he rants out "Retreads!" and blows a fuse), but he continues his trip undaunted on four flats.

Voice cast
 Donald Duck: Clarence Nash

Releases
 1943 – theatrical release
 c. 1972 – The Mouse Factory, episode #34: "Automobiles" (TV)
 c. 1983 – Good Morning, Mickey!, episode #36 (TV)
 1997 – The Ink and Paint Club, episode #1.56: "Wartime Disney" (TV)
 2011 – Have a Laugh!, episode #26 (TV)
 2019 – Disney+ (streaming)

Home media
The short was released on December 6, 2005, on Walt Disney Treasures: The Chronological Donald, Volume Two: 1942-1946.

Additional releases include:
 1984 – "Cartoon Classics - Limited Gold Edition: Donald" (VHS)

See also
 List of World War II short films
 Porky's Tire Trouble

References

External links
 Donald's Tire Trouble at the Internet Movie Database.
 

1943 films
1943 animated films
1943 short films
American World War II propaganda shorts
1940s Disney animated short films
Donald Duck short films
Tires
Animated films about automobiles
Films directed by Dick Lundy
Films produced by Walt Disney
Films scored by Oliver Wallace